In enzymology, a N2-(2-carboxyethyl)arginine synthase is an enzyme that catalyzes the chemical reaction

D-glyceraldehyde 3-phosphate + L-arginine  N2-(2-carboxyethyl)-L-arginine + phosphate

Thus, the two substrates of this enzyme are D-glyceraldehyde 3-phosphate and L-arginine, whereas its two products are N2-(2-carboxyethyl)-L-arginine and phosphate.

This enzyme belongs to the family of transferases, specifically those transferring aryl or alkyl groups other than methyl groups.  The systematic name of this enzyme class is glyceraldehyde-3-phosphate:L-arginine N2-(2-hydroxy-3-oxopropyl) transferase (2-carboxyethyl-forming). Other names in common use include CEAS, N2-(2-carboxyethyl)arginine synthetase, CEA synthetase, glyceraldehyde-3-phosphate:L-arginine 2-N-(2-hydroxy-3-oxopropyl), and transferase (2-carboxyethyl-forming).  This enzyme participates in clavulanic acid biosynthesis.

Structural studies

References

 
 

EC 2.5.1
Enzymes of known structure